The American Institute of Mining, Metallurgical, and Petroleum Engineers (AIME) is a professional association for mining and metallurgy, with over 145,000 members.  It was founded in 1871 by 22 mining engineers in Wilkes-Barre, Pennsylvania, United States, being one of the first national engineering societies in the country.  Its charter is to "advance and disseminate, through the programs of the Member Societies, knowledge of engineering and the arts and sciences involved in the production and use of minerals, metals, energy sources and materials for the benefit of humankind."  

It is the parent organization of four Member Societies, the Society for Mining, Metallurgy, and Exploration (SME), The Minerals, Metals & Materials Society (TMS), the Association for Iron and Steel Technology (AIST), and the Society of Petroleum Engineers (SPE). The organization is currently based in Dove Valley, Colorado.

History
Known by its original name American Institute of Mining Engineers (AIME) the institute had a membership at the beginning of 1915 of over 5,000, made up of honorary, elected, and associate members.  The annual meeting of the institute was held in February, with other meetings during the year as authorized by the council.  The institute published three volumes of Transactions annually and a monthly Bulletin which appeared on the first of each month.  The headquarters of the institute was in the Engineering Building in New York City.

Following creation of the Petroleum Division in 1922, the Iron and Steel Division in 1928 and the Institute of Metals Division in 1933 the name of the society was changed in 1957 to the American Institute of Mining, Metallurgical and Petroleum Engineers. Three of the current member societies were then created from the divisions, increasing to four in 1974 when the Iron and Steel Society (ISS) was formed. In 2004 ISS merged with the Association of Iron and Steel Engineers (AISE) to form the Association for Iron and Steel Technology (AIST) whilst remaining a member society of AIME.

Awards
The society awards some 25 awards every year at the annual conference. In addition, the member societies also disburse their own awards, including the Percy Nicholls Award, awarded by SME jointly with American Society of Mechanical Engineers.

Presidents
The following individuals have held the position of President of this organization.

 1871: David Thomas
 1872–1874: Rossiter Worthington Raymond
 1875: Alexander Lyman Holley
 1876: Abram Stevens Hewitt
 1877: Thomas Sterry Hunt
 1878–1879: Eckley Brinton Coxe
 1880: William Powell Shinn
 1881: William Metcalf
 1882: Richard Pennefather Rothwell
 1883: Robert Woolston Hunt
 1884–1885: James Cooper Bayles
 1886: Robert Hallowell Richards
 1887: Thomas Egleston
 1888: William Bleeker Potter
 1889: Richard Pearce
 1890: Abram Stevens Hewitt
 1891–1892: John Birkinbine
 1893: Henry Marion Howe
 1894: John Fritz
 1895: Joseph D. Weeks
 1896: Edmund Gybbon Spilsbury
 1897: Thomas Messinger Drown
 1898: Charles Kirchhoff
 1899–1900: James Douglas
 1901–1902: Eben Erskine Olcott
 1903: Albert Reid Ledoux
 1904–1905: James Gayley
 1906: Robert Woolston Hunt
 1907–1908: John Hays Hammond
 1909–1910: David William Brunton 
 1911: Charles Kirchhoff
 1912: James Furman Kemp
 1913: Charles Frederic Rand
 1914: Benjamin Bowditch Thayer
 1915: William Lawrence Saunders
 1916: Louis Davidson Ricketts
 1917: Philip North Moore
 1918: Sidney Johnston Jennings
 1919: Horace Vaughn Winchell
 1920: Herbert Hoover
 1921: Edwin Ludlow
 1922: Arthur Smith Dwight
 1923: Edward Payson Mathewson
 1924: William Kelly
 1925: John van Wicheren Reynders
 1926: Samuel A. Taylor
 1927: Everette Lee DeGolyer
 1928: George Otis Smith
 1929: Frederick Worthen Bradley 
 1930: William Hastings Bassett
 1931: Robert Emmet Tally
 1932: Scott Turner
 1933: Frederick Mark Becket 
 1934: Howard Nicholas Eavenson 
 1935: Henry Andrew Buehler
 1936: John Meston Lovejoy
 1937: Rolland Craten Allen
 1938: Daniel Cowan Jackling
 1939: Donald Burton Gillies
 1940: Herbert George Moulton
 1941: John Robert Suman 
 1942: Eugene McAuliffe
 1943: Champion Herbert Mathewson
 1944: Chester Alan Fulton
 1945: Harvey Seeley Mudd
 1946: Louis S. Cates
 1947: Clyde Williams
 1948: William Embry Wrather
 1949: Lewis Emanuel Young
 1950: Donald Hamilton McLaughlin
 1951: Willis McGerald Peirce
 1952: Michael Lawrence Haider
 1953: Andrew Fletcher
 1954: Leo Frederick Reinartz
 1955: Henry DeWitt Smith
 1956: Carl Ernest Reistle Jr.
 1957: Grover Justine Holt
 1958: Augustus Braun Kinzel
 1959: Howard Carter Pyle
 1960: Joseph Lincoln Gillson
 1961: Ronald Russel McNaughton
 1962: Lloyd E. Elkins
 1963: Roger Vern Pierce
 1964: Karl Leroy Fetters
 1965: Thomas Corwin Frick
 1966: William Bishop Stephenson
 1967: Walter R. Hibbard Jr.
 1968: John Robertson McMillan	
 1969: James Boyd
 1970: John C. Kinnear
 1971: John Smith Bell
 1972: Dennis L. McElroy
 1973: James B. Austin
 1974: Wayne E. Glenn
 1975: James D. Reilly
 1976: Julius J. Harwood
 1977: H. Arthur Nedom
 1978: Wayne L. Dowdey	
 1979: William H. Wise
 1980: M. Scott Kraemer
 1981: Robert H. Merrill
 1982: Harold W. Paxton
 1983: Edward E. Runyan
 1984: Nelson Severinghaus, Jr.
 1985: Norman T. Mills
 1986:  Arlen L. Edgar
 1987: Alan Lawley
 1988: Thomas V. Falkie
 1989: Howard N. Hubbard, Jr.
 1990: Donald G. Russell
 1991: Milton E. Wadsworth
 1992: Roshan B. Bhappu
 1993: G. Hugh Walker
 1994: Noel D. Rietman
 1995: Frank V. Nolfi, Jr.
 1996: Donald W. Gentry
 1997: Leonard G. Nelson
 1998: Roy H. Koerner
 1999: Paul G. Campbell, Jr.
 2000: Robert E. Murray
 2001: Grant P. Schneider
 2002: George H. Sawyer
 2003: Robert H. Wagoner
 2004: Robert C. Freas
 2005: Alan W. Cramb
 2006: James R. Jorden
 2007: Dan J. Thoma
 2008: Michael Karmis
 2009: Ian Sadler
 2010: DeAnn Craig
 2011: Brajendra Mishra
 2012: George W. Luxbacher
 2013: Dale Heinz
 2014: Behrooz Fattahi
 2015: Garry W. Warren
 2016: Nikhil Trivedi
 2017: John G. Speer

Vice presidents
1893–1894: Robert Gilmour Leckie

Society for Mining, Metallurgy & Exploration
The Society for Mining, Metallurgy & Exploration (SME) is for mining professionals.

Mining Engineering magazine
The Society for Mining, Metallurgy & Exploration publishes the monthly magazine Mining Engineering since 1949.

References

External links
 

 
Organizations based in Colorado
Organizations established in 1871
1871 establishments in Pennsylvania
Engineering societies based in the United States